Frederick Ethridge Broussard (born April 29, 1933) is a former American football player who played for Pittsburgh Steelers, New York Giants and Denver Broncos of the National Football League (NFL). He played college football at Texas A&M University and Northwestern State University.

References

1933 births
Living people
New York Giants players
Pittsburgh Steelers players
Players of American football from Louisiana
Denver Broncos (AFL) players
American football centers
Texas A&M Aggies football players
Northwestern State Demons football players